John Reed Porter (November 14, 1838 – October 15, 1923) was a recipient of the Medal of Honor, a military award presented by the United States Department of War to 18 Union Army soldiers who participated in the Great Locomotive Chase in 1862 during the American Civil War (1861–1865). He joined Union Army in 1861 and participated in the battles of Chickamauga, Stones River, Bentonville, and the campaigns of Chattanooga and Atlanta. At the end of the war he was a first lieutenant.

Biography
Porter was a native of Delaware County, Ohio. He joined the United States Army in 1861 as a private in Company G, 21st Ohio Infantry. In April 1862, he was to take part in a daring raid with 21 others (later known as "Andrews' Raiders" because they operated under the command of James J. Andrews). He overslept and missed out on the raid but was captured and imprisoned along with his fellow raiders within two weeks.  Porter and 14 others managed to escape, but only six of them reached friendly lines.  Porter was one of the six who managed to reach Union held territory. He served with the Union Army for the remainder of the war and was commissioned as a second lieutenant.  By the war's end he was promoted to first lieutenant. Following the war,  he returned to Ohio and was the last raider to die in 1923. He was buried in the McComb Union Cemetery, in McComb, Ohio.

Medal of Honor citation

Rank and Organization:
Rank and Organization: Private, Company G, 21st Ohio Infantry. Place and Date: Georgia, April 1862. Entered Service At: Findley, Ohio. Born: 14 November 1838, Delaware County, Ohio. Date Of Issue: September 1863.
Citation:

See also

List of American Civil War Medal of Honor recipients: M–P
List of Andrews Raiders

Notes

References

  

United States Army Medal of Honor recipients
United States Army officers
People from Delaware County, Ohio
People of Ohio in the American Civil War
1838 births
1923 deaths
American Civil War recipients of the Medal of Honor
Great Locomotive Chase